A New Hope is the first studio album by American Indie pop band Minipop, released in 2007.

Critical reception
Spin wrote that the band "deliver methodical, echoing, swoon-worthy numbers that display their brainiac tendencies." The East Bay Express wrote that Minipop is "at its best on songs like 'Ask Me a Question,' where conventional pop spills over its walls like a river cresting a levee." CMJ New Music Monthly stated that "the album's snappy dream pop and spacious songs never get old, fade or become dull."

Track listing

References

External links 
A New Hope, by Minipop

2007 albums
Minipop albums